The Château de Belœil is a château situated in the municipality of Belœil in the province of Hainaut, Wallonia, Belgium. It serves as the main residence of the princes of Ligne. The château lies in the middle of a Baroque garden designed in 1664. The château and gardens can be visited during spring and summer.

History
Belœil became a possession of the Ligne family in 1394. At the beginning of the 15th century, the local castle was chosen as the principal residence of the family. The old castle was a fortified rectangular building with a moat surrounding it and had four round towers, one at each angle.

This basic structure is still preserved, although the facades and interiors were greatly altered during the following centuries. The fortified castle was adapted into a luxurious country house (château), following the French example. The interiors were appointed with fine furniture and the art collection of the family.

During the New Year's celebrations of 1900, disaster struck the château when it burned down completely. Most of the furnishings, including the library of 20,000 rare volumes and the art collection, were saved. The château was rebuilt in the following years by the French architect Ernest Sanson, while the interiors were redecorated using pieces from the Ligne collections.

Gardens
From 1664 onward, the park was created, with straight alleys, geometrical ponds and imposing perspectives. The typical bosquets (garden chambers enclosed by high hedges) were preserved in spite of the changing fashion in the 18th and 19th centuries, when English landscape gardens were preferred. A small landscape garden with a folly was installed in the direct vicinity of the château by Charles Joseph, Prince de Ligne.

Gallery

See also
List of castles and châteaux in Belgium

References

External links

Wallonia's Major Heritage
Castles in Belgium
Castles in Hainaut (province)
Gardens in Belgium
Museums in Hainaut (province)
Historic house museums in Belgium